Raymond Todd Seabaugh (born March 1, 1961 in Encino, California) is a former American football linebacker who played professionally in the National Football League.

Seabaugh was selected in the third round of the 1983 NFL Draft by the Pittsburgh Steelers out of San Diego State University. Seabaugh is best remembered for wearing Jack Ham's number 59.

References 

1961 births
Living people
Players of American football from Los Angeles
American football linebackers
San Diego State Aztecs football players
Pittsburgh Steelers players
People from Encino, Los Angeles